Kids Can Rock and Roll is a children's television program that aired from 1993-1996 in Canada.  It was produced by Children's Hour Productions.  
The series ran another two years on the YTV children's cable channel.

The show featured the rock band Kideo, which consisted of Buddy Goodfellow on bass, Ace Manners on guitar, and P.J. Styles on drums, with all three members contributing vocals.  Each band member had a signature color - Goodfellow was green, Manners was blue, and Styles was red. These colors were reflected in their clothing, hair, masks, and face make-up.

Each episode featured four original rock songs for kids, including a live concert video. The band members also performed various activities with the intent of teaching the young viewers certain moral lessons.  Additional segments in the show included "Air-Robic Rock", Kideo Eye-View Movies, and Fan Mail.

They released three albums entitled Kids Can Rock and Roll (1986), In a World of Black and White (1989), and The Name of the Game (1993). They also released two videos - KIDEO in Concert and a KIDEO puppet video entitled The Puppetual World of Rock and Roll. Both videos featured songs and scenes from the TV series.

The show was broadcast in 23 different foreign territories.

References

External links
 
Buddy Goodfellow 

1990s Canadian children's television series
1993 Canadian television series debuts
1990s Canadian music television series
Canadian children's musical television series
YTV (Canadian TV channel) original programming
Canadian television shows featuring puppetry